Elections in India in 2021 include by-elections to the Lok Sabha, elections to the Rajya Sabha, elections to legislative assemblies of 4 states and 1 union territory, and other by-elections to state legislative assemblies, councils and local bodies.

Legislative assembly general elections

Parliamentary By-election

Legislative assembly By-elections

Andhra Pradesh

Assam

Bihar

Gujarat

Haryana

Himachal Pradesh

Jharkhand

Karnataka

Madhya Pradesh

Maharashtra

Meghalaya

Mizoram

Nagaland

Odisha

Rajasthan

Telangana

Uttarakhand

West Bengal

Local Body Elections

Andhra Pradesh

Chandigarh

Chhattisgarh

Goa

Gujarat

Himachal Pradesh

Karnataka

Meghalaya

Mizoram

Punjab

Rajasthan

Sikkim

Telangana

Tripura

West Bengal

See also 
 2020 elections in India
 2022 elections in India
 2021 Indian Rajya Sabha elections

References

External links

 Election Commission of India

2021 elections in India
India
2021 in India
Elections in India by year